John L. Doran (1815January 21, 1887) was an Irish American immigrant, lawyer, and Union Army officer in the American Civil War.  He also served one term in the Wisconsin State Assembly, representing the old 3rd ward of the city of Milwaukee in the 4th Wisconsin Legislature (1851).

Early career
John Doran was born in Ireland in 1815 and became a practicing attorney before emigrating to the United States.  He settled at Milwaukee, Wisconsin Territory, sometime before 1847 and resumed his law practice.

Politically, he became associated with the Democratic Party.  He was elected city attorney of Milwaukee in 1847 and served as a delegate from Milwaukee County to the 2nd Wisconsin constitutional convention, which produced the Constitution of Wisconsin.  In 1850, he was elected to the Wisconsin State Assembly, representing the 3rd ward of the city of Milwaukee.

Civil War service

In the run-up to the American Civil War, Doran became the leader of a Milwaukee-based company of Wisconsin militia volunteers known as the "Montgomery Guards".  After President Lincoln's call for volunteers, the Montgomery Guards were enrolled in the 6th Wisconsin Infantry Regiment, but Doran was instead appointed colonel of the 17th Wisconsin Infantry Regiment and tasked with recruiting and organizing that regiment.

The 17th Wisconsin Infantry, from its inception, was designated the "Irish Brigade" and recruited primarily from the Irish American population in Wisconsin.  Doran led the regiment for a year, through the Siege of Corinth and the Second Battle of Corinth, in which the regiment and Colonel Doran received praise for gallantry.  However, that Winter, Colonel Doran was compelled to resign and was placed under arrest by General John McArthur.

Postbellum years
Following his resignation, Doran moved to Chicago and resumed his legal career.  He died at his home in Chicago on January 21, 1887.

Notes

References

Further reading
 

|-

1815 births
1887 deaths
Date of birth uncertain
Irish emigrants to the United States (before 1923)
Wisconsin lawyers
Politicians from Milwaukee
Democratic Party members of the Wisconsin State Assembly
Union Army colonels
People of Wisconsin in the American Civil War
Military personnel from Wisconsin
19th-century American politicians
19th-century American lawyers